Ralph Cowan may refer to:

 Ralph Cowan (politician) (1902–1990), Canadian politician
 Ralph Cowan (footballer), Scottish footballer
 Ralph Cowan (cricketer) (born 1960), English cricketer
 Ralph Wolfe Cowan (1931–2018), American portrait painter.